HMS Cameleon was one of 20 s built for the Royal Navy in the 1910s. Completed in 1910, she saw active service in the First World War.

Design and description
The Admiralty provided general specifications, but each shipyard did their own detailed design so that ships often varied in size. The ships displaced  at deep load and their crew numbered 72 officers and ratings.

The destroyers were powered by a single Parsons steam turbine that drove three propeller shafts using steam provided by four Yarrow boilers.

The primary armament of the ships consisted of a pair of BL  MK VIII guns in single, unprotected pivot mounts fore and aft of the superstructure. They were also armed with two single QF 12-pounder guns, one on each broadside between the forward and centre funnels. These destroyers were equipped with a pair of single rotating mounts for 21-inch (533 mm) torpedo tubes amidships and carried two reload torpedoes.

Construction and career

Cameleon was ordered under the 1909–1910 Naval Programme from Fairfield Shipbuilding & Engineering Company. The ship was laid down at the company's Govan shipyard on 6 December 1909, launched on 2 June 1910 and commissioned in December. She was sold for scrap on 21 November 1921.

Citations

References

External links
 Acorn Class

 

Cameleon (1910)
Cameleon (1910)
1910 ships